The Federation of Evangelical Baptist Churches of France is a Baptist Christian denomination in France. It is affiliated with the National Council of Evangelicals of France and the Baptist World Alliance. The headquarters is in Paris.

History

The federation has its origins in a Baptist mission in Nomain, by the Swiss missionary Henri Pyt and his wife Jeanne Pyt, in 1820. In 1836, the Baptist pastoral school of Douai opened its doors.  In 1838, 7 Baptist churches and 150 members were established. In 1910, ten Baptist churches founded the Federation of Evangelical Baptist Churches of Northern France. In 1922, the Federation had churches in various regions of France and was renamed the "Federation of Evangelical Baptist Churches of France". In 1937, the Federation of Baptist Churches founded the Baptist Interior Mission (MIB) to plant new churches in France. According to a denomination census released in 2020, it claimed 108 churches and 6,091 members.

See also

 Bible
 Born again
 Baptist beliefs
 Worship service (evangelicalism)
 Jesus Christ
 Believers' Church

References

External links
Official Website 	

Baptist denominations in Europe
Baptist denominations established in the 20th century
Christian organizations established in 1922
Evangelicalism in France